Cyperus multispiceus is a species of sedge that is native to parts of north eastern Australia.

See also 
 List of Cyperus species

References 

multispiceus
Plants described in 2009
Flora of Queensland